George Ovadiah (c. 1925 – 1996), also known as George Obadiah, was an Iraqi-born Israeli film director, scriptwriter and producer.

Biography 
George Ovadiah was born in c. 1925 in Baghdad, Iraq. He immigrated to Iran in 1949, where he became an established filmmaker. In Iran he directed 25 films and occasionally was an actor. In 1967 he made "Harbor of Love", an Israeli-Iranian coproduction.

In 1969 he immigrated to Israel. Ovadiah directed 13 Israeli films, focused in melodrama and comedy genres, they were Bourekas film. Initially his films were box office successes, but his later films were failures. In 1996 the Israeli Film Academy paid a tribute to his memory.

He died on 27 June 1996 in Holon, Israel.

Filmography 

 1959 – 

See also
 Cinema of Israel
 Bourekas film

References

External links
 
 

Israeli film directors
Israeli film producers
Israeli male screenwriters
20th-century Israeli Jews
1925 births
1996 deaths
People from Baghdad
Iraqi expatriates in Iran
Iraqi emigrants to Israel
Iraqi screenwriters
Burials at Yarkon Cemetery
20th-century screenwriters
Iraqi film directors
Iranian filmmakers
Iranian film producers
Iranian film directors